The Bible has been fully translated into Uzbek. The full text was made publicly available for the first time September 29, 2011.

Scripture portions were first translated in 1886, with Gospels translated by M. Ostrumoff, Russian Inspector of Schools. The proof-sheets were revised by Dr. Radlof, Rev. A. Amirkhaniantz, of Tiflis, and Dr. Sauerwein. Because of orthography issues it took a long time for their work to be published, Luke was only published in 1890, the Four Gospels being completed in 1891.

In 1917 the Gospels were published in the Uzbek-Arabic script and an affiliate of the International Bible Society set up in Tashkent the capital.

During the period of Soviet rule little further translations were made.

Following Independence in 1991 the Bible Society was reconstituted in 1993. With the help of the United Bible Societies and Institute for Bible Translation it began to translate the whole Bible into modern Uzbek using the Cyrillic alphabet. After 2000 most portions were published in both Cyrillic and Latin scripts.

Jehovah's Witnesses released a translation of the New Testament in modern Uzbek in 2010 and a translation of the entire Bible in 2017.

Printed Portions and dates
1981 John
1983 Genesis & John
1986 Four Gospels
1992 NT, Genesis, Psalms
1996 Children's Bible
1998 Proverbs  (Cyr/Rom) 2000, 2004
2001 Ruth, Esther, Jonah (Cyr/Rom), 2004
2003 1-2 Samuel, 1-2 Kings, Daniel (Cyr/Rom)
2003 Ecclesiastes (Cyr/Rom)
2006 Genesis, Exodus, Numbers, Joshua, Judges

References

External links
The entire Uzbek Bible - is online at the Institute for Bible Translation.
 - Bible Society of Uzbekistan home page

Uzbek
Christianity in Uzbekistan